Ilir Daja (born 20 October 1966 in Tirana) is an Albanian professional football coach and former player who is the current manager of the Ballkani.

Club career
Daja spent his youth career with 17 Nëntori, before playing for Dinamo Tirana for ten years. In 1989, in Dinamo's European Champion Clubs' Cup clash against Dinamo București, Daja suffered a major knee injury that forced him to go on surgery several times.

Managerial career
Daja started his managerial career in 2005 with Elbasani whom he stayed until 2007, helping the club to win the Kategoria Superiore in 2005–06 season. Then he signed with Dinamo Tirana two seasons later to prevail again in this competition.

Tirana
In October 2015, Daja begun negotiations with Tirana and on 28th, Daja signed a contract until the end of the season. He was presented to the media the next day. Tirana defeated Kukësi 2–1 at home in Daja's first match in charge, returning in winning ways after three league matches. On 1 November 2016, following the goalless draw against Vllaznia, Daja was released from his contract by club president Refik Halili.

Skënderbeu
On 3 January 2017, Daja was hired as the new coach of Skënderbeu hours after the departure of Andrea Agostinelli, who was released from the club. He was introduced the next day, declaring that if the team didn't win the league, it would be a big failure.

In the summer of 2017, Daja guided the team in the 2017–18 UEFA Europa League qualifying rounds, being the mastermind as Skënderbeu achieved group stage for the second time ever and also become the first Albanian club to pass four rounds. They easily won in the first qualifying round versus amateur side Sant Julià, progressing to the next round 6–0 on aggregate. In the second round, Skënderbeu managed a 1–1 draw versus Kairat at Almaty Central Stadium for the first leg; despite being down in the first ten minutes after a Gerard Gohou, the team pushed for an equalizer and got it thanks to a Bakary Nimaga tap-in. In the second leg, Daja's team won 2–0 to progress to next round 3–1 on aggregate; his decision to play Sebino Plaku for James Adeniyi resulted a success as the striker scored the second goal with a lob.

In the first match of third round versus Mladá Boleslav, Skënderbeu lost 2–1 after a late goal scored by the opposition, only one minute after Skënderbeu's equalizer. In the second match, Daja's side won with the same score, which led the match to penalty shootouts where his side was more precise as they won 4–2 to reach the play-off for the third time in history. In the play-off round, the team played Dinamo Zagreb; they earned a 1–1 draw at Stadion Maksimir despite being on lead until the injury time, before holding on to a goalless draw in the returning leg to group stage on away goal rule.

On 9 May 2018, Skënderbeu was confirmed as Kategoria Superiore champion following a 4–2 win at Lushnja and Kukësi's 3–2 away defeat to Teuta. Later on 27 May, he led to team to the Albanian Cup success, by defeating 1–0 Laçi in the final for their first ever Albanian Cup title. Skënderbeu thus completed the domestic double for the first time in history. Daja also become the first manager since Sulejman Mema in 1999 to achieve this feat.

On 19 June 2018, after Court of Arbitration for Sport upheld UEFA's decision to exclude Skënderbeu from UEFA competitions for the next 10 years, Daja announced his departure from the club.

Managerial statistics

Honours

Player

Kategoria Superiore: 1
 1990

Manager

Skënderbeu
 Kategoria Superiore: 2017–18
 Albanian Cup: 2017–18

Balkani
 Football Superleague of Kosovo: 2021–22

References

External links

1966 births
Living people
Footballers from Tirana
Albanian footballers
Association football midfielders
FK Dinamo Tirana players
Albanian football managers
KF Elbasani managers
FK Dinamo Tirana managers
Besa Kavajë managers
KF Tirana managers
KF Skënderbeu Korçë managers
Flamurtari Vlorë managers
Kategoria Superiore players
Kategoria Superiore managers